Nosphistica undulata is a moth in the family Lecithoceridae. It was described by Kyu-Tek Park in 2002. It is known from Thailand.

References

Moths described in 2002
Nosphistica